The 13th Lumières Awards ceremony, presented by the Académie des Lumières, was held on 13 January 2008. The ceremony was chaired by Claude Lelouch. The Diving Bell and the Butterfly won the award for Best Film and Jean-Pierre Marielle was presented with the honorary Lumières Award.

Winners and nominees
Winners are listed first and highlighted in bold.

See also
 33rd César Awards

References

External links
 
 
 13th Lumières Awards at AlloCiné

Lumières Awards
Lumieres
Lumieres
Lumieres
Lumieres